Rhema FM is the name used for a number of Christian radio stations established with the help of, and assisted for many years by United Christian Broadcasters (UCB) in Australia. Each station is independent, being run and programmed locally with many having moved away from the Rhema name. UCB has also established the Vision Radio Network across Australia, which is entirely networked from UCB's Brisbane studios.

The name and logo of "Rhema FM" was derived from one of UCB's affiliate networks in New Zealand that was then of the same name. See New Zealand's Rhema.

UCB no longer recognises affiliations with other radio stations because it has given up its role as a co-ordinating body to focus on operating as a broadcaster in its own right. Rhema stations, and UCB's own Vision Radio Network retain affiliation with each other by being members of Christian Media Australia (formerly the Association of Christian Broadcasters), which operates as the peak body for Christian media.

Formats

In the majority of cases, the format of Christian Radio is loosely based on commercial radio styles, generally infusing Christian content by means of music tracks and short segments, such as Focus On The Family and other widely acceptable forms of Christian content.

Other stations present talk based formats, such as 3ABN, Faith-FM and similar services.

Stations

Current stations
The following stations are currently using the Rhema FM name in Australia:
Rhema FM 89.7 Tamworth
Rhema FM 94.9 Central Coast
Rhema FM 99.9 Port Macquarie
Rhema FM 99.7 Newcastle
Rhema FM 106.5 Manning Great Lakes/Taree
Rhema FM 105.1 Wide Bay
Rhema FM 101.7 Mount Isa

Former stations
Other stations originally started under the Rhema FM name, but now under another name:
1WAY FM 91.9 Canberra, Australian Capital Territory
4CRM FM 107.5 Mackay, Queensland
4TVR FM 92.3 Cairns/Mareeba, Queensland
8KTR FM 101.3 Katherine, Northern Territory
96three FM (96.3) Geelong, Victoria
Life FM 101.9 Wagga Wagga, New South Wales 
Orange's 103.5 Orange, New South Wales
Purpose FM 92.1 Armidale, New South Wales
Cooloola Christian Radio 91.5 Gympie, Queensland
Freedom FM 94.1 Coffs Harbour, New South Wales
Cross FM 94.9 Broken Hill, New South Wales
Fresh FM 91.9 Gladstone, Queensland
Live FM 99.9 Townsville, Queensland
Ram FM 103.3 Goulburn, New South Wales
Star FM 97.3 Griffith, New South Wales
Darwin's 97 Seven (97.7) Darwin, Northern Territory
Dubbo's 94.3 Dubbo, New South Wales
Life FM 100.1 Bathurst, New South Wales
Life FM 103.9 Lithgow, New South Wales
Loving Life 103.1 Grafton, New South Wales
Lime FM 104.9 Mount Gambier, South Australia
Pulse FM 94.1 Wollongong, New South Wales
The Light 98.5 Albury, New South Wales/Wodonga, Victoria
Fish Radio 94.5 Bourke, New South Wales 
Juice FM 107.3 Gold Coast, Queensland
Life FM 103.9 Sale, Victoria
Riverland FM 100.7 Renmark, South Australia
Salt FM 106.5 Sunshine Coast, Queensland
Voice FM 92.9 Toowoomba, Queensland

Christian radio stations in Australia
Community radio stations in Australia
Evangelical radio stations